Ido Mosseri (born April 17, 1978) is an Israeli actor, voice actor, musician, director and television presenter.

Biography

Early life
Mosseri was born in Tel Aviv, to a Jewish family. In addition to being a child actor, he was educated at Arison Campus. He later studied at Thelma Yellin High School of Arts. He was drafted into the Israeli army at the age of 18 and after his army service, he continued to study acting at Nissan Nativ's studio in Tel Aviv.

Film and television
Mosseri’s first appearance on television was in the children's program Tofsim Rosh in 1987. He participated in several other Israeli television shows, amongst them were Service Not Included and A Matter of Time. Between 2006 and 2007, he participated in the third and fourth seasons of the Israeli daily comedy musical drama Our Song. He also received guest roles in the television shows The Pyjamas, Polishuk, The Arbitrator and Naor's Friends. As of 2020, he began receiving roles in The Jews are Coming.

During the course of his studying he participated in several student movies and also participated in the 2003 film Exile To Heaven, the 2004 film Late Reaction and the 2006 film Offside. Mosseri achieved some international roles as well. In 2008, he was a central cast member playing the role of Oori Shulimson in You Don't Mess with the Zohan starring Adam Sandler. The two worked together once more in the 2011 film Bucky Larson: Born to Be a Star, in which the latter was a producer.

Dubbing 
Throughout the years, Mosseri also participated greatly in dubbing animated television shows and movies into the Hebrew language. For television, he has received attention for dubbing the title character in SpongeBob SquarePants. He also dubbed Touya Kinomoto in Cardcaptor Sakura, Jackie Chan in Jackie Chan Adventures, Meowth in Pokémon, Leonardo in Teenage Mutant Ninja Turtles, Sonic in Sonic X, King Koopa in Super Mario Bros. Super Show!, Carlos in Transformers: Armada, Batman in Batman Beyond, Oscar the Grouch in Rechov Sumsum, Fuzzy Lumpkins in The Powerpuff Girls and others.

In Mosseri’s film dubbing roles, he reprised the role of SpongeBob in the films and he also served as the voice director for the first film. He made his first dubbing contribution as a child voicing Oliver in Oliver & Company. His other roles include Crane in Kung Fu Panda,  Marty in Madagascar, Jim Hawkins in Treasure Planet, Alpha in Up, Syndrome in The Incredibles, Krusty, Professor Frink, Otto and others in The Simpsons Movie, Kovu in The Lion King II: Simba's Pride, The Fish in The Cat in the Hat, Terry McGinnis in Batman Beyond: Return of the Joker, Donatello in TMNT, Duke Caboom in Toy Story 4, Bruno Madrigal in Encanto, and Sebastian J. Cricket in Guillermo del Toro's Pinocchio.

Stage
As a child, Mosseri was very active on stage. During his teen years, he acted in the theatre organisation of the Israel Defense Forces. In addition, he performed mainly at the Gesher Theatre, where he starred in theatrical adaptations of The King and I, Les Misérables, Macbeth and he also starred in a stage adaptation of Fiddler on the Roof between 2006 and 2019 also he starred in a stage adaptation of Rumpelstiltskin  
  
Mosseri has also worked at the Beersheba Theatre, the Beit Lessin Theatre as well as the Haifa Theatre.

Music
Between 1992 and 1995, Mosseri was a member of the Tel Aviv Youth Band. In 2009, he released a spoken word album which he signed with Hed Arzi Music. He also performed a song on Liran Danino’s debut album in 2012.

Mosseri has also performed the opening songs of some international television shows into the Hebrew language such as Captain N: The Game Master and The Bear's Island''.

Personal life
Mosseri is the younger brother of popular actor and entertainment personality Tal Mosseri. He also dated actress Ella Rosenzweig for a while.

References

External links

 
 
 
 

1978 births
Living people
Male actors from Tel Aviv
Israeli Mizrahi Jews
Israeli Ashkenazi Jews
Israeli Sephardi Jews
20th-century Israeli Jews
21st-century Israeli Jews
Jewish Israeli male actors  
Israeli male musical theatre actors
Israeli male child actors
Israeli male film actors
Israeli male stage actors
Israeli male television actors
Israeli male voice actors
Israeli television presenters
Israeli voice directors
Thelma Yellin High School of Arts alumni
20th-century Israeli male actors
21st-century Israeli male actors
20th-century Israeli male musicians
21st-century Israeli male musicians
Jewish singers